Antelmo Alvarado García is a Mexican politician affiliated with the Institutional Revolutionary Party. He served as Senator of the LXI Legislature of the Mexican Congress  representing Guerrero as replacement of Ángel Aguirre Rivero. He also served in the Chamber of Deputies and the Congress of Guerrero

References

Living people
Politicians from Guerrero
People from Taxco
Members of the Senate of the Republic (Mexico)
Institutional Revolutionary Party politicians
Year of birth missing (living people)
20th-century Mexican politicians
21st-century Mexican politicians
Members of the Congress of Guerrero
Members of the Chamber of Deputies (Mexico)